El Colegio is a municipality and town of Colombia in the department of Cundinamarca.

References 

Municipalities of Cundinamarca Department